Matteo Sergio Cavagna (born 22 September 1985) is an Italian footballer who plays as a midfielder for Albese.

Career
A former Juventus youth product, in the summer of 2005, Cavagna left for Ravenna in a co-ownership deal, for a nominal fees of €500. After Ravenna won the Serie C1 Group B Championship in 2007, Cavagna was loaned to Pro Sesto of Serie C1.

In June 2009 Ravenna purchase the remaining 50% registration rights of Cavagna. In 2011, he was signed by A.C. Prato.

On 7 July 2014 Cavagna signed a new 3-year contract with the club.

On 27 January 2017 Cavagna left for Lupa Roma F.C. in a temporary deal, with Tommaso Ceccarelli moved to opposite direction.

On 6 December 2017, Cavagna signed for Albese Calcio.

Honours
Ravenna
Serie C1 (Group B): 2006–07

References

External links
 Profile at AIC.Football.it 
 

1985 births
Footballers from Turin
Living people
Italian footballers
Juventus F.C. players
Ravenna F.C. players
S.S.D. Pro Sesto players
A.C. Prato players
Serie C players
Association football midfielders